Far Out Recordings is a UK-based record label specialising in the music of Brazil. It was founded in the mid-1990s and is run by DJ, entrepreneur and producer Joe Davis. Music released on the label extends from samba, jazz, MPB, soul and disco, to house, broken beat, electronica and remixes.

Since the mid-1990s Far Out Recordings has been releasing new albums by Azymuth, Arthur Verocai, Marcos Valle, Joyce, Sabrina Malheiros, The Ipanemas, Banda Black Rio, Antonio Adolfo and Amaro Freitas.

The label has released numerous previously unreleased archival recordings, including Hermeto Pascoal's Viajando Com O Som, Azymuth's Demos (1973-75), a Milton Nascimento performance of two ballets, Marcos Resende & Index's 1976 debut album, and Jose Mauro's A Viagem Das Horas. The latter was released as part of Far Out's Quartin series: reissuing the catalogue of Brazilian producer Roberto Quartin's 1970s label, this reissue series also included Jose Mauro's Obnoxius and early works by Victor Assis Brasil and Piry Reis.

The label is also well known for its electronic, dance and club releases having put out original productions and remixes by Theo Parrish, Mark Pritchard, Dego, Andres, Marcellus Pittman, Kirk Degiorgio, Nicola Conte, Henry Wu and Rick Willhite among others.

Among Far Out's catalogue also is a series of mixes called Brazilika, which includes entries from 4hero, Andy Votel, Gilles Peterson and Kenny "Dope" Gonzalez.

Artists
Azymuth
Marcos Valle
Hermeto Pascoal
Joyce
Milton Nascimento
Amaro Freitas
The Ipanemas (with Wilson das Neves)
Sabrina Malheiros
Zeep (with Nina Miranda)
Nomade Orquestra
Nicola Conte 
Nana Vasconcelos
Sean Khan
Grupo Batuque
Dori Caymmi
Banda Black Rio
Irakere
Heidi Vogel
Kirk Degiorgio

References

External links
 – official site

British record labels
House music record labels
World music record labels
Folk record labels
Electronic music record labels
Psychedelic trance record labels
Pop record labels
Easy listening record labels
Smooth jazz record labels
Soundtrack record labels
Hip hop record labels
Electronic dance music record labels
Experimental music record labels